Geoffrey Britton (born 1 August 1943) is an English rock drummer known for his work with Wings from August 1974 to January 1975, where he was featured on the Venus and Mars album.

Career 
Britton was born in Lewisham, South East London). He was a member of the progressive rock band East of Eden which formed in Bristol from June to December 1969 and recorded the album Snafu. Afterward he joined the Wild Angels. After leaving Wings in early 1975 Britton was a member of Manfred Mann's Earth Band from 1978 to 1979, playing on the Angel Station album. In 1977 he was in the supergroup Rough Diamond, recording in London's Roundhouse Studios. In the early 1980s, he joined the power pop group the Keys, whose one album was produced by Joe Jackson.

Kickboxing 
With Maeji Suzuki, based at the AMA HQ in London, Britton ran the Mugendo kickboxing school. The school had several successful fighters. Britton's team competed at many kickboxing events in London during the late 1970s and early 1980s.

References

English rock drummers
Manfred Mann's Earth Band members
1943 births
Living people
People from Lewisham
Musicians from Kent
Paul McCartney and Wings members
 English kickboxers